Graduate School of Management may refer to:

Graduate School of Management, University of California, Davis
Graduate School of Management, University of Dallas, USA
Graduate School of Management, St. Petersburg State University, Russia